Anguillicoloides novaezelandiae is a parasitic nematode worm that lives in the swimbladders of eels (Anguilla spp.), particularly Anguilla australiensis, Anguilla anguilla and Anguilla dieffenbachii. Specimens have been located in Italy (where it is thought to have been introduced) and New Zealand (where it is a native species). The species is most similar to A. Australiensis. However, it differs from the latter species in the shape of the head end which is bulbously inflated, almost spherical, and followed by a marked neck constriction in A. Australiensis, whereas it is only slightly expanded in A. novaezelandiae. Also, the anterior ovary in A. australiensis females extends anteriorly to about the mid-length of the oesophagus, while it does not reach the end of the oesophagus in A. novaezelandiae. Both species differ in size and form. The shape of the posterior end of the female body is different in these two species.

The state of being colonized by Anguillicola nematodes is termed anguillicolosis.

Description
The species is medium-sized and darkly coloured. Epicuticle aspinose. Head end with slight neck constriction just in front of nerve ring. Buccal capsule is smaIl, sclerotised, with minute circumoral teeth. Its oesophagus is expanded at its posterior half. The valvular apparatus of the oesophagus is well developed. Its nerve ring is located below the neck constriction, while its excretory pore is near te junction of the oesophagus and intestine. The latter is dark, almost straight and broad. Three conspicuously large oval unicellular rectal glands are present; an additional small one might also be present. Its tail is conical and pointed.

References

Further reading 
Kennedy, C. R. (1993). Introductions, spread and colonization of new localities by fish helminth and crustacean parasites in the British Isles: a perspective and appraisal. Journal of Fish Biology, 43: 287–301.
Koops, H., & Hartmann, F. (1989). Anguillicola infestations in Germany and in German eel imports. Journal of Applied Ichthyology, 1: 41–45.

External links 

Camallanida
Nematodes described in 1988
Worms of New Zealand